Colonel Hugh Stewart Cochrane VC (4 August 1829 – 23 April 1884) was a recipient of the Victoria Cross for his actions, as a 28-year-old lieutenant, during the Indian Mutiny. He later achieved the rank of colonel and commanded the 43rd Foot and (briefly) its successor, the 1st Battalion, Oxfordshire and Buckinghamshire Light Infantry. Cochrane was born in Fort William, Scotland and died in Southsea in England.

Cochrane was a lieutenant in the 86th (Royal County Down) Regiment of Foot (later The Royal Irish Rifles), British Army stationed in India during the Indian Mutiny. For the following deed on 1 April 1858 near Jhansi, India he was awarded the Victoria Cross, the highest and most prestigious award for gallantry in the face of the enemy that can be awarded to British and Commonwealth forces:

References

External links
 The Victoria Cross Awarded to Men of Portsmouth – Hugh Stewart Cochrane VC
Location of grave and VC medal (Hampshire)

Indian Rebellion of 1857 recipients of the Victoria Cross
British recipients of the Victoria Cross
86th (Royal County Down) Regiment of Foot officers
43rd Regiment of Foot officers
Oxfordshire and Buckinghamshire Light Infantry officers
1829 births
1884 deaths
People from Fort William, Highland
Royal Fusiliers officers
British Army recipients of the Victoria Cross
Burials in Hampshire
Scottish military personnel